RTI or Rti may refer to:

Broadcasters 

 Radiodiffusion Television Ivoirienne, state broadcaster of Ivory Coast
 Radio Taiwan International, a radio station in Taiwan
 Reti Televisive Italiane, an Italian broadcaster and subsidiary of Mediaset

Other businesses

 RTI International, formerly Research Triangle Institute, a not-for-profit American research organization
 RTI International Metals, an American company producing titanium
 RTI Producciones, a Colombian television production company

In science and technology

In computing and telecommunications 
 Run-time infrastructure (simulation)

In medicine 
 Reproductive tract infection
 Respiratory tract infection
 Reverse-transcriptase inhibitor, a class of antiretroviral drug

Other uses in science and technology
 Ramp travel index, a measure of an off road vehicle articulation, ability to keep all wheels in contact with the ground over uneven terrain
 Rayleigh–Taylor instability, an instability of an interface between two fluids of different densities which occurs when the lighter fluid is pushing the heavier fluid
 referred-to-input
 Reflectance Transformation Imaging, a computational photographic method that can reveal hidden details about cultural or forensic artifacts
 Receiver Transmitter line card, in the MIDS radio communication standard
 Response Time Index, a measure of the thermal responsiveness of fire sprinklers
 Relative temperature index, UL plastic thermal-aging criteria

Other uses
 Response to intervention, in education
 Right to Information Act, 2005, India
 Rti (Lučani), a village in Serbia
 Resistance to interrogation, a technique taught to soldiers